The FIFA World Cup is an international association football competition contested by the men's national teams of the members of Fédération Internationale de Football Association (FIFA), the sport's global governing body. The championship has been awarded every four years since the first tournament in 1930, except in 1942 and 1946, due to World War II.

The tournament consists of two parts, the qualification phase and the final phase (officially called the World Cup Finals). The qualification phase, which currently take place over the three years preceding the Finals, is used to determine which teams qualify for the Finals. The current format of the Finals involves 32 teams competing for the title, at venues within the host nation (or nations) over a period of about a month. The World Cup Finals is the most widely viewed sporting event in the world, with an estimated 715.1 million people watching the 2006 tournament final.

Hungary have appeared in the FIFA World Cup on nine occasions, the first being at the 1934 where they reached the quarter-final. They have been runners-up on two occasions, in 1938 and 1954. They have failed to qualify for the FIFA World Cup since 1986.

Record at the FIFA World Cup

*Draws include knockout matches decided on penalty kicks

By Match

Record by Opponent

FIFA World Cup Finals

1938 World Cup Final v Italy

The third edition of the FIFA World Cup was the first without the host team competing in the final. At half-time, defending champions Italy were leading by 3-1 and Hungary did not manage to get back into the game.

1954 World Cup Final v West Germany

The Hungarian Golden Team were favourites for winning the World Cup in Switzerland in 1954 after 31 unbeaten games in the previous five years, among them a recent 7-1 against England and an 8–3 against their West German opponents in the group stage only two weeks before the final.

In one of the greatest comebacks in football history, the favoured Hungarians were defeated 2-3 despite an early 2–0 lead.

Record players

Top goalscorers
With 11 goals in five matches in 1954, Sándor Kocsis beat Brazilian Ademir's existing record of nine goals in one tournament from 1950. However, only four years later the record was in turn beaten by Just Fontaine.

Goalscoring By Tournament

References

External links
Hungary at FIFA
World Cup Finals Statistics

 
Countries at the FIFA World Cup
Hungary national football team